Howard "Howdy" Myers Jr. (August 23, 1910 – February 12, 1980) was an American football, basketball and lacrosse coach and college athletics administrator.  He served as head football coach for Johns Hopkins University from 1946 to 1949 and again in 1979 and at Hofstra University from 1950 to 1974, compiling a career college football record of 167–112–5.  Myers was also the head lacrosse coach at Johns Hopkins from 1946 to 1949, at Hofstra from 1950 to 1975, and at Hampden–Sydney College from 1976 to 1978, amassing a career college lacrosse record of 261–159–4. In addition, he was the head basketball coach at Johns Hopkins from 1946 to 1949, tallying a mark of 22–35. Myers coached lacrosse at St. Paul's School in Brooklandville, Maryland where he coached that team to four straight undefeated seasons, with a record of 61 wins and no losses. In 1971, Myers was inducted into the National Lacrosse Hall of Fame.

Myers died of heart failure on February 12, 1980, at Johns Hopkins Hospital in Baltimore, Maryland, after having undergone cancer surgery a week earlier.

Head coaching record

College football

Honors
Hofstra University honored Howdy Myers by placing a bust outside its main athletic complex.

See also
 List of college men's lacrosse coaches with 250 wins
 List of college football head coaches with non-consecutive tenure

References

1910 births
1980 deaths
American men's basketball players
High school baseball coaches in the United States
High school basketball coaches in Maryland
High school football coaches in Maryland
High school lacrosse coaches in the United States
Johns Hopkins Blue Jays football coaches
Johns Hopkins Blue Jays men's basketball coaches
Johns Hopkins Blue Jays men's lacrosse coaches
Hofstra Pride athletic directors
Hofstra Pride football coaches
Hofstra Pride men's lacrosse coaches
Virginia Cavaliers football players
Virginia Cavaliers men's basketball players